This is a list of Maldives women Twenty20 International cricketers. A Twenty20 International is an international cricket match between two representative teams. A Twenty20 International is played under the rules of Twenty20 cricket. In April 2018, the International Cricket Council (ICC) granted full international status to Twenty20 women's matches played between member sides from 1 July 2018 onwards. The Maldives women's team made their Twenty20 International debut on 2 December 2019 against Nepal in Pokhara Stadium, Pokhara during the 2019 South Asian Games.

The list is arranged in the order in which each player won her first Twenty20 cap. Where more than one player won her first Twenty20 cap in the same match, those players are listed alphabetically by surname.

Key

Players
Statistics are correct as of 7 December 2019.

References

Maldives
Cricket